The 1974 Duke Blue Devils football team represented Duke University during the 1974 NCAA Division I football season.

Schedule

References

Duke
Duke Blue Devils football seasons
Duke Blue Devils football